Lee Tae-im (born September 2, 1986) is a South Korean actress. She graduated from Sunggwang Highschool and dropped out from Hanyang University, while majoring Theater and Film. She played the leading role in the series Don't Hesitate (2009), as well as supporting roles in the movies Days of Wrath (2013) and For the Emperor (2014).

Controversies
In March 2015, while filming the Korean TV show My Tutor Friend Lee Tae-im and Kim Ye-won had a fight, with Lee Tae-im reportedly swearing at Kim Ye-won. After the incident, Lee Tae-im claimed that Kim Ye-won initiated the fight by using informal speech to address her, as informal speech is considered rude to be used while addressing older people and seniors in Korean culture. Despite her claims, Lee Tae-im received public backlash, which caused her to withdraw from My Tutor Friend and other TV shows she was in. She publicly apologized to Kim Ye-won and announced hiatus.

However, less than a month later, video footage of Lee Tae-im and Ye-won quarrelling began circulating on the Internet, proving Lee Tae-im's claims that Kim Ye-won used informal speech to address her. This caused the public sentiment to shift, with Kim Ye-won's remarks from the footage becoming a subject of various parodies. After the backlash, Kim Ye-won ultimately apologized to Lee Tae-im.

Filmography

Films

Television series

Variety shows

Awards and nominations

References

External links

1986 births
Living people
South Korean television actresses
South Korean film actresses
People from Ulsan
Hanyang University alumni